Greenmount may refer to:

Australia
Greenmount Beach, a headland on the Gold Coast of Queensland
Greenmount, Queensland (Mackay Region), a rural locality in Central Queensland
Greenmount Homestead, a heritage-listed homestead in Queensland
Greenmount, Queensland (Toowoomba Region), a rural town on the Darling Downs, Queensland
Greenmount War Memorial, a heritage-listed war memorial in Greenmount
Greenmount, Western Australia, a suburb of Perth

Canada
Greenmount, Prince Edward Island, community in Canada

Ireland
Greenmount motte, ancient site in County Louth

New Zealand
Greenmount, New Zealand, a suburb of Auckland
Green Hill, New Zealand, a volcano in Auckland

United Kingdom
Greenmount, Greater Manchester, village in England
Greenmount Housing Estate, in Northern Ireland

United States
Greenmount, Maryland, in Carroll County
Greenmount, Baltimore, Maryland, a city neighborhood
Green Mount Cemetery, in Baltimore, Maryland
The GreenMount School, in Baltimore, Maryland